Aleksander Słuczanowski (13 September 1900 – 11 September 1942) was a Polish ice hockey player. He played for AZS Warszawa during his career. He won the Polish league championship three times, from 1927 until 1929. Słuczanowski played for the Polish national team, including the first international match for Poland in December 1924, and later played at the 1928 Winter Olympics. He was killed during World War II.

References

External links
 

1900 births
1942 deaths
AZS Warszawa (ice hockey) players
Ice hockey players at the 1928 Winter Olympics
Olympic ice hockey players of Poland
People from Stavropol
People from Stavropol Governorate
People from the Russian Empire of Polish descent
Polish ice hockey defencemen
Polish civilians killed in World War II